Sergey Nikolay o‘g‘il Andreyev (born 14 September 1970) is an Uzbekistani football coach and a former player.

Honours
Tavriya Simferopol
Ukrainian Premier League: 1992

Neftchi FK
Uzbek League: 1995
Uzbekistan Cup: 1996

References

External links
 
 

1970 births
Living people
Pakhtakor Tashkent FK players
Soviet footballers
Navbahor Namangan players
SC Tavriya Simferopol players
Uzbekistani footballers
Uzbekistani expatriate footballers
Expatriate footballers in Ukraine
Uzbekistani expatriate sportspeople in Ukraine
Ukrainian Premier League players
Uzbekistan international footballers
Expatriate footballers in Germany
Uzbekistani expatriate sportspeople in Germany
FK Neftchi Farg'ona players
FC Nasaf players
PFC Krylia Sovetov Samara players
Expatriate footballers in Russia
Uzbekistani expatriate sportspeople in Russia
Russian Premier League players
FC Volgar Astrakhan players
Dempo SC players
Expatriate footballers in India
Uzbekistani expatriate sportspeople in India
FC Zvezda Irkutsk players
Association football forwards
FC Novokuznetsk players